Lindgomycetaceae is a family of fungi in the order Pleosporales. Described as new to science in 2010, the family contains seven genera.

The following genera are accepted within Lindgomycetaceae:
 Aquimassariosphaeria
 Arundellina
 Hongkongmyces
 Lindgomyces
 Lolia
 Neolindgomyces
 Xenovaginatispora

References

External links 
 

Pleosporales
Aquatic fungi
Dothideomycetes families